Copelatus jarrigei is a species of diving beetle. It is part of the genus Copelatus in the subfamily Copelatinae of the family Dytiscidae. It was described by Legros in 1954.

References

jarrigei
Beetles described in 1954